The 2007 Cork Junior A Hurling Championship was the 110th staging of the Cork Junior A Hurling Championship since its establishment by the Cork County Board in 1895. The championship began on 7 October 2007 and ended on 21 October 2007.

On 21 October 2007, Barryroe won the championship following a 2-19 to 2-13 defeat of Chareville in the final. This was their first championship title in the grade.

Charlevill'e John Quinlan was the championship's top scorer with 4-24.

Qualification

Results

First round

Semi-finals

Final

Championship statistics

Top scorers

Overall

In a single game

References

Cork Junior Hurling Championship
Cork Junior Hurling Championship